Caryophyllia smithii, the Devonshire cup coral, is a species of solitary coral in the family Caryophylliidae. It is native to the northeastern Atlantic Ocean, the North Sea and the Mediterranean Sea. There are shallow and deep-water forms which are structurally different. It forms part of a biodiverse community of rock encrusting organisms and is often parasitised by a barnacle.

Description
It is usually broader than it is high. The septa (vertical radial calcareous plates) are arranged in four to five cycles and have smooth edges. The polyp is translucent and the colour is variable and may be white, pink, orange, red, brown or bright green. Sometimes there are contrasting regions of colour, especially forming a zig-zag pattern round the mouth. The tentacles are colourless except for the white or brown terminal knobs and the many tiny warts. A form found in deep water is smaller and more delicate; it has an inverse cone shape which is narrowed at the base, while shallow water forms are cylindrical and more robust.

Distribution and habitat
Caryophyllia smithii is found in the northeastern Atlantic Ocean as far north as the Shetland Islands, the North Sea and the Mediterranean Sea. Sometimes its narrow base becomes detached from the substrate and it lives free on the seabed. This coral is abundant around the west coasts of the British Isles below the Laminaria zone and may occur at densities of over 100 per square metre below the red algae zone, being found both on flat rock and in crevices.

Ecology

The habitat of Caryophyllia smithii is often dominated by sponges and bryozoans and these also grow on the corallum of the coral. The larvae of the barnacle Megatrema anglicum often settle near the rim of the corallum where they appear to be immune to the coral's nematocysts. They become attached to the stony material and the coral's epithelium overgrows them except for their operculums. A single coral may be colonised by multiple barnacles and these have a tendency to aggregate on one particular part of the coral, often the lower side when corals are growing on vertical surfaces. The presence of these barnacles is semi-parasitic as the coral's tentacles retract when they come into contact with the barnacle's cirri (feeding appendages), and this hampers its food-gathering activities.

References

Caryophylliidae
Cnidarians of the Atlantic Ocean
Fauna of the Mediterranean Sea
Animals described in 1828
Taxa named by William Broderip